Celebrity Eclipse is a  operated by Celebrity Cruises, a subsidiary of Royal Caribbean Group. After she was ordered with German shipbuilder Meyer Werft in July 2006, she saw her keel laid in February 2007 and she was formally delivered in April 2010. The -vessel followed sister ships Celebrity Solstice and Celebrity Equinox as the third Solstice-class ship in the fleet.

Design and construction
The keel of Celebrity Eclipse was laid on 14 February 2007 and she was floated out of her drydock on 28 February 2010. The ship was delivered to Celebrity on 15 April 2010 in Eemshaven and was christened by British yachtswoman Emma Pontin on 24 April 2010.

Celebrity Eclipse is the third Solstice-class ship, preceded by Celebrity Solstice and Celebrity Equinox. Solstice-class ships were designed to save energy through their photovoltaic systems and an optimized hull design with efficient hull coatings and lighting systems using light-emitting diodes.

Service history

2010 Iceland volcanic eruption

In response to the 2010 shutdown of UK airspace due to the eruption of Iceland's Eyjafjallajökull volcano, the newly completed Celebrity Eclipse returned 2,000 British tourists stranded in Spain as "an act of goodwill" by the owners, sailing from Southampton to Bilbao on 21 April and returning on 23 April.

2011 crew member overboard incident

Allegations of poor working conditions
In October 2012 Channel 4 TV aired a Dispatches undercover documentary that exposed poor working conditions and exploitation of workers on Celebrity Eclipse.  Allegations include flying under a flag of convenience to enable the ship owners to be unconstrained by employment legislation, including minimum wages and working hours. The documentary showed footage of workers who had no rest days in many months, and workers who had to pay helpers to enable them to fulfil their duties. Celebrity Cruises denied the allegations in the documentary.

COVID-19 pandemic

Passengers began disembarking from the ship in San Diego on 30 March 2020 after her last sailing. In April, allegations surfaced that the ship had failed to protect passengers from known cases of COVID-19. Passengers and crew had tested positive despite Celebrity's original public denials of any cases on board. One man died in the United States four days after returning home in the United States and his wife also tested positive. Another passenger, an 83-year-old man, was reported dead in Queensland, Australia on 18 April.

After disembarking the passengers the ship was placed under a no-sail order, effective through July, by the Centers for Disease Control. As of May 2020 Celebrity Eclipse and two other cruise ships were still at anchor offshore from San Diego. Approximately 700 crew were reportedly still aboard Celebrity Eclipse.

References

External links
Official website

Eclipse
Ships built in Papenburg
2010 ships
Cruise ships involved in the COVID-19 pandemic